The Party's Over is the debut album by Talk Talk. It was released in 1982 and produced by Colin Thurston, who was a former engineer for David Bowie but was better known for producing Duran Duran's first two albums.

Release 

The Party's Over was released in July 1982 by record label EMI.

In the United Kingdom, the album's single "Today" was a top-twenty hit. The remixed version of the single "Talk Talk" reached number 1 in South Africa in 1983 and number 23 in the UK. In the United States the album entered the Billboard Top 200, reaching number 132, while the single "Talk Talk" peaked at number 75.

In New Zealand, the album was a hit, peaking at number 8 due to the success of "Today", which reached number 10 in 1983.

Track listing

Personnel
Talk Talk
Mark Hollis – lead vocals and backing vocals
Paul Webb – fretless bass and backing vocals
Simon Brenner – synthesizers and piano
Lee Harris – electronic drums and drum machine

Charts

Certifications

Notes

References 

1982 debut albums
Talk Talk albums
Albums produced by Colin Thurston
EMI Records albums
Sophisti-pop albums